Urban folk or city folk may refer to:
Folk music from any urban cultural tradition (as opposed to country music)
CityFolk Festival, an annual music festival in Ottawa, Canada
Anti-folk music,  a music genre that takes and subverts the earnestness of politically charged 1960s folk music
People, residing in cities
Animal Crossing: City Folk, the third video game in the Animal Crossing series